Lyman Copeland Draper (September 4, 1815August 26, 1891) was a librarian and historian who served as secretary for the State Historical Society of Wisconsin at Madison, Wisconsin. Draper also served as Superintendent of Public Instruction of Wisconsin from 1858 to 1860.

Biography
Lyman Copeland Draper was born on September 4, 1815, in Evans, New York, a descendant of early Massachusetts settler James Draper (1618–1694). Growing up he often heard about the exploits of his grandfathers and father in the Revolution and the War of 1812.  He developed a keen interest in the history of those times. Starting in the 1838, Lyman Draper corresponded with people who were early settlers in the Trans-Allegheny region during the second half of the 18th century. He also traveled extensively in the region to gain a better feel for the territory. Draper's professed purpose was to shed light on the era and gain knowledge before it was completely forgotten. He planned to write a series of biographies on early settlers in the region and document the Indian Wars in the Ohio River Valley.

Although Draper never finished his biographies, his correspondence with survivors of the time and their relatives provide the largest single first-hand account of the settlement of the region. He published 10 volumes of historical notes for the Wisconsin Historical Society, as well as a volume about the Battle of King's Mountain (1780). This featured many of the early settlers.

Draper was elected a member of the American Antiquarian Society in 1877.

He died on August 26, 1891, in Madison, Wisconsin.

Lyman Draper Manuscript Collection
The Lyman Draper Manuscript Collection includes his extensive notes and correspondence as well as the works and papers of a number of notable early Americans, collected by Lyman Draper on the history of the trans-Allegheny West. This area includes portions of the Carolinas, Virginia, Georgia, Alabama, the entire Ohio Valley, and the Mississippi Valley.  Among the most notable of the figures whose papers he collected are Joseph Brant, Daniel Boone, George Rogers Clark, Thomas S. Hinde, John Donelson, James Robertson, General Joseph Martin, and Simon Kenton. Most materials cover the time period from the 1740s through the 1810s.  The Draper Collection comprises nearly 500 volumes.

The State Historical Society of Wisconsin (now Wisconsin Historical Society), for which Draper served as corresponding secretary from 1854 to 1886, owns the collection of original 18th and 19th-century papers. Major research libraries around the United States have microfilm of the collection.

References

Further reading 
 Anderson, Rasmus Björn. Biographical Sketch of Lyman C. Draper, LL. D., Secretary of the State Historical Society of Wisconsin. Cincinnati: P. G. Thomson, 1881.
 Dabney, Lucius Bryan. "A Southerner's Defense of Lyman Draper". The Wisconsin Magazine of History, vol. 38, no. 3 (Spring 1955): 131-134.
 Doane, Gilbert H. "Lyman Draper, Founder of a Great Library". The Wisconsin Magazine of History, vol. 37, no. 4 (Summer 1954): 207-209. 
 Fowlkes, John Guy. "The Educators' Debt to Lyman Copeland Draper". The Wisconsin Magazine of History, vol. 38, no. 1 (Autumn 1954): 30. 
 Harper, Josephine L. A Guide to the Draper Manuscripts. Madison: State Historical Society of Wisconsin, 1983.
 Hesseltine, William B. and Larry Gara. "The Historical Fraternity: Correspondence of Historians Grigsby, Henry and Draper". The Virginia Magazine of History and Biography, vol. 61, no. 4 (Oct 1953): 450-471.
 Hesseltine, William B. "Lyman Copeland Draper, 1815-1891". The Wisconsin Magazine of History, vol. 35, no. 3 (Spring 1952): 163-166. 
 Hesseltine, William B. "Lyman Draper and the South", Journal of Southern History, vol. 19, no. 1 (Feb 1953): 20–31.
 Hesseltine, William B. Pioneer's Mission: The Story of Lyman Copeland Draper. Madison: State Historical Society of Wisconsin, 1954.
 Kellogg, Louise Phelps. "The Services and Collections of Lyman Copeland Draper". The Wisconsin Magazine of History, vol. 5, no. 3 (Mar 1922): 244-263.
 Thwaites, Reuben Gold. "Lyman Copeland Draper: A Memoir". In Collections of the State Historical Society of Wisconsin, vol. 12, pp. 1–22. Madison, Wis.: State Historical Society of Wisconsin, 1892.
 Wall, Bennett H. "In the Footsteps of Draper". The Wisconsin Magazine of History, vol. 41, no. 1 (Autumn 1957): 4-7.

External links
 About the Draper Manuscript Collection at the Wisconsin Historical Society
 
 

1815 births
1891 deaths
Politicians from Lockport, New York
Writers from Wisconsin
19th-century American historians
Historians of the American Revolution
Historians of the United States
History of the Midwestern United States
Educators from Wisconsin
Superintendents of Public Instruction of Wisconsin
American male non-fiction writers
19th-century American politicians
19th-century American male writers
Members of the American Antiquarian Society
Historians from New York (state)
19th-century American educators